Pternistis  is a genus of galliform birds formerly classified in the spurfowl group of the partridge subfamily of the pheasant family. They are described as "partridge-francolins" in literature establishing their phylogenetic placement outside the monophyletic assemblage of true spurfowls. All species are endemic to Sub-Saharan Africa, excepted the double-spurred spurfowl (also present in Morocco). They are commonly known as spurfowls or francolins, but are closely related to jungle bush quail, Alectoris rock partridges, and Coturnix quail. The species are strictly monogamous, remaining mated indefinitely. They procure most of their food by digging. Spurfowls subsist almost entirely on roots, beans of leguminous shrubs and trees, tubers, and seeds, and feasting opportunistically on termites, ants, locusts, flowers, and fruit. Important predators are jackals, caracals, servals, and birds of prey, as well as herons and marabou storks.

The genus Pternistis was introduced by the German naturalist Johann Georg Wagler in 1832. The name is from the Ancient Greek pternistēs meaning "one who strikes with the heel". The type species was designated by the English zoologist George Robert Gray in 1841 as the Cape spurfowl (Pternistis capensis).

Most of the species within the genus formerly included "francolin" in their common name. Beginning in 2004 various ornithologists have recommended that it would be clearer to restrict the use of "francolin" to members of the genus Francolinus and closely related genera (Peliperdix, Ortygornis, Campocolinus, Scleroptila) and to use "spurfowl" for all members of the genus Pternistis. Both are in different tribes within the subfamily Pavoninae: Pternistis is placed with the Old World quails in the tribe Coturnicini, while the true francolins are placed with the junglefowl in the tribe Gallini. This recommendation was adopted in 2020 by Frank Gill and colleagues in the online list of world birds that they maintain on behalf of the International Ornithological Committee (IOC). The common name "spurfowl" is also used for the three Asian species that are placed in the genus Galloperdix.

Species

The genus contains 24 species:
 Hartlaub's spurfowl, Pternistis hartlaubi
 Mount Cameroon spurfowl, Pternistis camerunensis
 Handsome spurfowl, Pternistis nobilis
Chestnut-naped spurfowl, Pternistis castaneicollis
Erckel's spurfowl, Pternistis erckelii
Djibouti spurfowl, Pternistis ochropectus
 Swierstra's spurfowl, Pternistis swierstrai
 Ahanta spurfowl, Pternistis ahantensis
 Grey-striped spurfowl, Pternistis griseostriatus
Jackson's spurfowl, Pternistis jacksoni
 Red-billed spurfowl, Pternistis adspersus
 Cape spurfowl, Pternistis capensis
 Natal spurfowl, Pternistis natalensis
Hildebrandt's spurfowl, Pternistis hildebrandti
Double-spurred spurfowl, Pternistis bicalcaratus
Scaly spurfowl, Pternistis squamatus
Heuglin's spurfowl, Pternistis  icterorhynchus
 Clapperton's spurfowl, Pternistis clappertoni
 Harwood's spurfowl, Pternistis harwoodi
 Swainson's spurfowl, Pternistis swainsonii
 Yellow-necked spurfowl, Pternistis leucoscepus
 Grey-breasted spurfowl, Pternistis rufopictus
 Red-necked spurfowl, Pternistis afer

Notes

References

 
Bird genera